The Animas Valley is a lengthy and narrow, north–south  long, valley located in western Hidalgo County, New Mexico in the Bootheel Region; the extreme south of the valley lies in Sonora-Chihuahua, in the extreme northwest of the Chihuahuan Desert, the large desert region of the north-central Mexican Plateau and the Rio Grande valley and river system.

The Continental Divide of the Americas forms the valley's eastern border in a series of mountain ranges. The parallel valley eastwards on the eastern side of the Continental Divide is the slightly shorter, but also long and narrow Playas Valley.

Westwards of the narrow, lengthy and divided Peloncillo Mountains, are the two valleys in Arizona, the San Simon and San Bernardino Valleys, both east of the massif of the Chiricahua Mountains and associated mountain ranges, which anchor the eastern half of Cochise County. Parts of this entire region with its mountain ridgelines, and mountaintops, and associated valleys are part of the sky island region called the Madrean Sky Islands of Arizona–New Mexico, and Sonora–Chihuahua, in the Sonoran and Chihuahuan Deserts.

Description
The Animas Valley is linear, north–south trending, surrounded by mountain ranges, and is part of the Basin and Range Province of southwest North America.  At the southern extremity of the valley straddling the United States and Mexico border lies the Pleistocene aged Lake Cloverdale  The extreme north has the Lordsburg Mesa located northwest of Lordsburg and is on the northern perimeter of the Animas Valley, south of the west-flowing Gila River and the towns of Virden and Red Rock.

References

External links

Animas Valley Watershed, US EPA
Shaded Relief Map, The Chiricahua and Peloncillo Mountains Region
Cloverdale, NM ghost town area

Great Divide of North America
New Mexico Bootheel
Chihuahuan Desert
Landforms of Hidalgo County, New Mexico
Valleys of New Mexico
Valleys of Mexico
Landforms of Sonora
Landforms of Chihuahua (state)